The Gafsa events is the name given to the armed operation carried out by commandos of the Libyan-backed Tunisian nationalist opposition in January 1980, after which they infiltrated the city of Gafsa through the city of Tebessa in Algeria. The attackers managed to take control of most of the city's centers, but their calls for the residents to revolt were unsuccessful. Tunisian security and army forces eventually managed to retake the city and capture the attackers, including his leader Ezzedine Chérif. The operation led to a sharp deterioration in relations between Tunisia and Libya and negatively affected the relationship of the Tunisian regime with the Algerian government, which was cold in the early 1980s.

References

1980 in Tunisia
Cold War rebellions
Conflicts in 1980
Military history of Tunisia
Muammar Gaddafi
January 1980 events in Africa
Libya–Tunisia relations